Donald George Wing  (born 27 April 1938) is a former Australian politician. A member of the Tasmanian Legislative Council from 1982 to 2011, representing the electoral division of Launceston (briefly named Paterson), he was President of the Legislative Council from 2002 until 2008. Wing was also Mayor of Launceston from 1983 to 1987.

Wing was born in Ulverstone, and was first elected to the Legislative Council on 22 May 1982. He is a Bachelor of Laws from the University of Tasmania and before entering parliament practised as a barrister. He has served as an Alderman of the Launceston City Council and as Mayor thereof; a path that was later followed by fellow conservative independent MLC Ivan Dean. He has vocally supported Dean in the face of criticism for holding both positions at once, arguing that his own experience shows that such a career is workable.

Although Wing is a former president of the Tasmanian branch of the Liberal Party, he has always served as an independent in the Legislative Council due to his party's stance of not endorsing partisan candidates to the body and instead backing conservative independents.  He announced that he would not contest his seat at the next election in May 2011, and relinquished the presidency to allow himself more scope to debate issues on the floor of the Legislative Council chamber.

External links
 

Independent members of the Parliament of Tasmania
1938 births
Living people
Presidents of the Tasmanian Legislative Council
University of Tasmania alumni
Mayors of Launceston, Tasmania
Members of the Order of Australia
21st-century Australian politicians
Tasmanian local councillors